Raymond J. Corsini (June 1, 1914 – November 8, 2008, Honolulu) was an encyclopedist and lexicographer in the field of psychology.

References

External links
https://web.archive.org/web/20050924102143/http://www.apa.org:80/divisions/div1/news/fall2002/fall-corsini.pdf
Raymond J. Corsini, the Dictionary of Psychology (Psychology Press: 1999) 
https://web.archive.org/web/20061114162806/http://www.psychotherapyinstitute.com/documents/IndividualEducationFull.pdf

1914 births
2008 deaths
20th-century American psychologists
American encyclopedists
American lexicographers
20th-century lexicographers
American psychologists